Briston Lee Maroney is an American singer, songwriter, and guitarist from Knoxville, Tennessee who is signed to Canvasback Music and Atlantic Records. He has released two EPs through the labels, including his most recent collection, "Sunflower” which was partially released and the full album was released April 9, 2021.

Early life

Briston Maroney largely grew up in Knoxville, Tennessee. In August 2013, at age 15, Maroney tried out for the 13th season of American Idol at one of its audition bus stops in Knoxville. He was then selected to audition in front of the American Idol judges in Salt Lake City. There, he sang a version of The Rolling Stones' "You Can't Always Get What You Want" on an episode that aired in January 2014. The judges voted to advance him to Hollywood, where he became one of 30 semi-finalists. Maroney did not advance beyond that point.

Maroney sang and played guitar in the bluegrass band Subtle Clutch from 2013 to 2015. The band began busking on the street corners of Knoxville, and played venues such as Dollywood, The Square Room, and the WDVX Blue Plate Special, as well as music festivals such as Knoxville's Rhythm N' Blooms.

Maroney attended Lipscomb University in Nashville, Tennessee, where he studied music.

Career

In 2015, he independently released his first EP, Reason to Shake.

In 2017, Maroney independently released an EP called Big Shot. In 2018, he began releasing new tracks, including "Under My Skin", "I've Been Waiting", and "Freakin' Out on the Interstate". Those songs all appeared on his first EP with Canvasback Music and Atlantic Records called Carnival, released in November 2018. "Freakin' Out on the Interstate" ended up being certified Gold by RIAA in 2021. In March 2019, Maroney made his first appearance at South by Southwest. He also opened for Liz Cooper & The Stampede and Wallows on their respective tours that year.

In May 2019, he released his second major label EP, Indiana, a collection of songs focusing on the change that came from his time spent living between Knoxville, California, and Florida, and ultimately his move to Nashville. Indiana featured the lead single "Caroline". Later that month, another song from the collection, "Fool's Gold", was featured on Taylor Swift's Apple Music "Playlist by ME!". A music video for that song was released the following month.

He performed at Austin City Limits Music Festival in October 2019.

Maroney cites John Prine, Bob Dylan, and Neil Young as some early influences. He has also expressed his appreciation for indie rock bands like Wallows, The Districts, and Illiterate Light, as well as current Americana acts such as Dogwood Tales, Jason Isbell, and Kacey Musgraves.

Personal life
Maroney stated that, within the span of about a month in 2018, he dropped out of college, ended a relationship, and, thus, had to find a permanent place to stay and a stable job to work at. Despite being underage at that time, he went to rehab for about two months. He kept figuring out what to do with his life as he moved from Knoxville to California, from there to Florida, and from Florida back to Nashville, during which time he decided to keep pursuing a career in music.

Discography

EPs

Singles

References

External links
Official website

Atlantic Records artists
Musicians from Knoxville, Tennessee
Songwriters from Tennessee
Folk musicians from Tennessee
American Idol participants
Living people
1998 births